Richards Mansion may refer to:

Richards Mansion (Wheat Ridge, Colorado), listed on the National Register of Historic Places in Jefferson County, Colorado
Richards Mansion (Georgetown, Delaware), listed on the National Register of Historic Places in Sussex County, Delaware

See also
Richards House (disambiguation)